Let's Live Tonight is a 1935 American musical comedy film directed by Victor Schertzinger and starring Lilian Harvey, Tullio Carminati and Janet Beecher. The film was made as part of an unsuccessful attempt to establish Harvey, who was a top box office draw in Germany, as a major star in Hollywood. Harvey was under contract to Fox Film, but was loaned out to Columbia Pictures for the production. After making it, Harvey returned to Europe, first to Britain to appear in Invitation to the Waltz and then to Germany, where she starred in Black Roses, which relaunched her German career.

Partial cast
 Lilian Harvey as Kay 'Carlotta' Routledge
 Tullio Carminati as Nick 'Monte' Kerry
 Janet Beecher as Mrs. Routledge
 Hugh Williams as Brian Kerry
 Tala Birell as Countess Margot de Legere
 Luis Alberni as Mario Weems
 Claudia Coleman as Lily Montrose
 Arthur Treacher as Ozzy Featherstone
 Gilbert Emery as Maharajah de Jazaar
 Virginia Hammond as Mrs. Mott
 Adrian Rosley as Cafe Propreitor
 Max Rabinowitz as Pianist
 André Cheron as Frenchman
 John Binet as French Steward

References

Bibliography

External links

1935 films
American musical comedy films
1935 musical comedy films
Films directed by Victor Schertzinger
Columbia Pictures films
American black-and-white films
Films produced by Robert North
1930s English-language films
1930s American films